See It Saw It is a children's game show about a king who rules over the kingdom of "Much Jollity-on-the-Mirth". It ran from 6 January 1999 to 26 March 2001. The programme was filmed entirely in a studio, with an audience of children, who at various points in the show would be asked an observation question by the King, which they would answer by climbing on board a giant see saw.

The majority answer would be indicated by which way the see saw tipped. The show's main catchphrase is "did you see it?" asked by the king, to which the audience would shout back, "we saw it!".

The show was created and produced by Clive Doig, and most of the cast had also appeared in previous shows created by Doig: Mark Speight and Philip Fox were both part of the supporting cast in the GMTV programme Eat Your Words, while both Sylvester McCoy and Julia Binsted had long histories of working with Doig, both having appeared in the classic series Jigsaw in the 1980s.

The only newcomer in the main cast was Natasha Collins as the Jester See. Following a serious accident in 2000, Collins was unavailable for subsequent series, and the role was completely taken over by Kate Crossley.

Transmissions

Series

Compilations

References

External links
 
 
 

1999 British television series debuts
2001 British television series endings
1990s British children's television series
2000s British children's television series
1990s British game shows
2000s British game shows
BBC children's television shows
BBC television game shows
British children's game shows
English-language television shows
Television series set in the Middle Ages